Willem Abraham Stephanus Aucamp, known as Willie Aucamp, is a South African politician from the Northern Cape. He has been a permanent delegate to the National Council of Provinces since 2019. He is one of six permanent delegates from the province. Aucamp is a member of the Democratic Alliance (DA). Aucamp is also the son of former MP Cassie Aucamp.

Biography
Aucamp was born in Thabazimbi and matriculated from Frikkie Meyer High School.

His father, Cassie Aucamp, was elected to the National Assembly of South Africa in the general election of 1999 for the Afrikaner Eenheidsbeweging (AEB). Cassie left the AEB in 2003 to form the National Action (NA). Willie joined the NA and was the party's Gauteng provincial leader.

The NA lost all of its parliamentary representation in the April 2004 general election and was soon dissolved. Willie married New National Party (NNP) spokesperson Carol Johnson in July 2004. The couple soon joined the African National Congress (ANC). Aucamp's marriage with Johnson was short-lived as Johnson filed for divorce in September 2004, citing Aucamp's financial status and her not being informed about his child that was born out of wedlock.

Aucamp later joined the Democratic Alliance (DA). In 2016, he was elected as a ward councillor of the Ga-Segonyana Local Municipality.

In May 2019, Aucamp was elected to the National Council of Provinces. He is one of six permanent delegates from the Northern Cape.

Aucamp was a candidate for Northern Cape DA leader. The provincial congress was held on 5 December 2020. The DA provincial chairperson, Harold McGluwa, won the election.

References

External links
Willem Abraham Stephanus Aucamp – People's Assembly
Mr Willem Abraham Stephanus Aucamp – Parliament of South Africa

Living people
Members of the National Council of Provinces
People from Thabazimbi Local Municipality
People from Limpopo
People from Ga-Segonyana Local Municipality
People from the Northern Cape
Afrikaner people
Year of birth missing (living people)
Democratic Alliance (South Africa) politicians